Villa Marina may refer to:
 Villa Marina (race horse), a Thoroughbred racehorse
 Villa Marina, Isle of Man, an entertainment venue in Douglas, Isle of Man
 Villa Marina Hotel, a building in Ensenada, Baja California